Bonaria Manca (10 July 1925 – 17 October 2020) was an Italian painter of the naïve art style.

Biography
Manca was born in Orune in Sardinia. She arrived in Tuscania in 1950 with her family. The twelfth of thirteen children in a family of shepherds, she was set to follow in her family's footsteps. The treatment of wool and fabric in water would come into representation in her later works. She has been exhibited in Rome, Turin, Paris, Lyon, Geneva, Thessaloniki, Marseille, and the Netherlands. In 2000, she transformed her house in Tuscania into a small museum, called La Casa dei Simboli. She painted scenes of rural life, women washing clothing in rivers, and surrealist figures. Writer and filmmaker Jean-Marie Drot said of her work: "What I like about Bonaria's work is that almost nothing comes from the head, but everything comes from the heart. For me, it's a cosmic painting. [...] The house of Bonaria, in a way, is perhaps unique in all of Italy. Having a Bonaria painting is like having a talisman, a lucky charm in a world of loneliness, like opening a window to the next day, a future full of light".

Bonaria Manca died in Tuscania on 17 October 2020 at the age of 95.

References

1925 births
2020 deaths
Italian painters
People from the Province of Nuoro